A general election was held in the U.S. state of North Carolina on November 6, 2018.

2018 United States House of Representatives elections in North Carolina

2018 North Carolina judicial election

2018 North Carolina House of Representatives election

References

External links
 published on May 14, 2019 CBS News

 
North Carolina